The ion transporter (IT) superfamily is a superfamily of secondary carriers that transport charged substrates.

Families 
As of early 2016, the currently recognized and functionally defined families that make up the IT superfamily include:
 2.A.8 - The Gluconate:H+ Symporter (GntP) Family
 2.A.11 - The Citrate-Mg2+:H+ (CitM) Citrate-Ca2+:H+ (CitH) Symporter (CitMHS) Family
 2.A.13 - The C4-Dicarboxylate Uptake (Dcu) Family
 2.A.14 - The Lactate Permease (LctP) Family
 2.A.34 - The NhaB Na+:H+ Antiporter (NhaB) Family
 2.A.35 - The NhaC Na+:H+ Antiporter (NhaC) Family
 2.A.45 - The Arsenite-Antimonite (ArsB) Efflux Family
 2.A.47 - The Divalent Anion:Na+ Symporter (DASS) Family
 2.A.61 - The C4-dicarboxylate Uptake C (DcuC) Family
 2.A.62 - The NhaD Na+:H+ Antiporter (NhaD) Family
 2.A.68 - The p-Aminobenzoyl-glutamate Transporter (AbgT) Family
 2.A.94 - The Phosphate Permease (Pho1) Family
 2.A.101 - The Malonate Uptake (MatC) Family 
 2.A.111 - The Na+/H+ Antiporter-E (NhaE) Family
 2.A.118 - The Basic Amino Acid Antiporter (ArcD) Family

See also 
 Ion transporters
 Sodium-Proton antiporter
 Arsenite-Antimonite efflux
 Amino acid transporter
 Solute carrier family
 Transporter Classification Database
 Membrane protein

References 

Solute carrier family
Protein superfamilies